John D. Ballard House, also known as the Ballard-Worsham House, is a historic home located at Bedford, Virginia. It was designed by noted Lynchburg architect Stanhope S. Johnson and built in 1915.  It is a two-story, brick dwelling in the Colonial Revival style.  It has a steep deck-on-hip roof with terra cotta Spanish roofing tiles, a formal front facade with segmentally arched windows, and a one-story front portico, with grouped Doric order columns. Also on the property is a contributing meat house / tool shed.

It was listed on the National Register of Historic Places in 1997. It is located in the Bedford Historic District.

References

Houses on the National Register of Historic Places in Virginia
Colonial Revival architecture in Virginia
Houses completed in 1915
National Register of Historic Places in Bedford, Virginia
Individually listed contributing properties to historic districts on the National Register in Virginia
Houses in Bedford County, Virginia
1915 establishments in Virginia